Thomas Bastiaan Pleyte (23 October 1864 in Leiden – 25 March 1926 in The Hague) was a Dutch politician.

Pleyte was Minister of the Colonies in the cabinet of Pieter Cort van der Linden. He became known as a liberal minister who founded the People's Council in 1916, a move that is widely regarded as the important first step to give the native population of the Netherlands East Indies (now Indonesia) an equal say in government. Pleyte was fluent in Malay and Javanese.

See also
List of Dutch politicians

References

|-

1864 births
1926 deaths
Ministers of Colonial Affairs of the Netherlands
19th-century Dutch lawyers
People from Leiden
Leiden University alumni